John London was a musician.

John London is also the name of:

John Griffith London, American writer
John London (MP) for Leicester (UK Parliament constituency)
John London (priest) (c.1486–1543), Warden of New College, Oxford

See also
Jon London, film director
Jack London (disambiguation)
John of London